Andorra has a multi-party system. The party system in Andorra has changed dramatically since the adoption of the new Constitution in 1993. Prior to that, there was no national circumscription in the elections and political parties were essentially limited to parochial outfits.

Current parties

Extra-parliamentary parties

Defunct parties
Andorra for Change (Andorra pel Canvi)
Andorran Democratic Centre (Centre Demòcrata Andorrà)
Century 21 (Segle 21)
Democratic Party (Partit Demòcrata)
Democratic Renewal (Renovació Democràtica)
National Democratic Group (Agrupament Nacional Democràtic)
New Centre (Nou Centre)
Parochial Union of Independents Group (Grup d'Unió Parroquial Independents)
Parochial Union of Ordino (Unió Parroquial d'Ordino)
Reformist Coalition (Coalició Reformista) 
Renewal Party of Ordino (Partit Renovador d'Ordino)
Union, Common Sense and Progress (Unió, Seny i Progrés)
Unity and Renewal (Unitat i Renovació)

See also
 Politics of Andorra
 List of political parties by country

Andorra
 
Political parties
Political parties
Andorra